Maribel is a Spanish name, formed as a contraction of María Isabel. 

Maribel may refer to:

People
Maribel Guardia, actress born in Costa Rica and living in Mexico
Maribel, a fictional character from the video game Dragon Warrior VII
Mother Maribel of Wantage (1887-1970), Anglican nun and artist

Other uses
Maribel, Wisconsin
Maribel (TV series), a 1989 Venezuelan telenovela

See also 
 
 Mirabel (disambiguation)